In the Groove (abbreviated ITG) is a rhythm game developed & published by Roxor Games, and is the first game in the In the Groove series. The game was shown in an official beta-testing preview on July 9, 2004, and was officially released in arcades around August 30, 2004. A PlayStation 2 port of In the Groove was released on June 17, 2005 by RedOctane.

Gameplay

The game mechanics of In the Groove are similar to Konami's Dance Dance Revolution (DDR) series. The game involves the player moving their feet to a set pattern, stepping in time to the general rhythm or beat of a song. During normal gameplay, arrows scroll upwards from the bottom of the screen and pass over flashing stationary arrows (referred to as the "guide arrows" or "receptors"). Similar to DDR's gameplay, there are 4 flashing stationary arrows. When the scrolling arrows overlap the stationary ones, the player must step on the corresponding arrows on the dance platform. Longer arrows referred to as "holds" must be held down for their entire length for them to count. Successfully hitting the arrows in time with the music increases the amount of health on the life bar, while failure to do so decreases it. If the life bar is fully depleted during gameplay, the player fails the song (unless the fail at end of song setting is on), usually resulting in a game over. Otherwise, the player is taken to the Results Screen, which rates the player's performance with a letter grade and a percentage score, among other statistics. The player may then be given a chance to play again, depending on the settings of the particular machine (the limit is usually 3-5 songs per game).

Stepcharts on In the Groove are a predefined sequence of arrows and other items mapped to the timing of a song, and they vary depending on the song's difficulty. Stepcharts can sometimes contain 3 or 4 arrow combinations (supposed to be hit with hands but usually hit by placing one or two feet between two arrows making them hit both). Stepcharts can also contain Mines. If a player is on an arrow when a mine passes through the step zone for that arrow, it will explode and health on the life bar will be lost.

Modifiers (also referred to as mods) change the display of how arrows and other items in a stepchart work. They include Speed Multipliers (to space out the position of the scrolling arrows so less can be seen at once), Perspective (to change the behavior of how arrows scroll, such as having slower-moving arrows at the top and faster-moving arrows at the bottom), and Note (to change the appearance of how arrows look; some Note options change the color of the arrow depending on the rhythm of the song).

Modes of Gameplay
In The Groove offers different modes of gameplay, each with different rules on how songs are selected and played.

Dance Mode is the default mode of play. In this mode, a player chooses a number of individual songs to play (the default is three).  After the songs are played, the game is over.

Marathon Mode is an extended mode of play.  In this mode, a player chooses a predefined configuration of songs that may also have a predefined set of modifiers in order to make the songs more challenging to play.  Marathon courses typically have four songs, although some have five songs.

Battle Mode is a specialized "versus" mode of play. Two players (or one player against the computer) play three individual songs of the same difficulty.  During the song, successfully executed steps fill up a player's "power bar".  When the power bar completely fills, a modifier is applied to the opposing player's side.

Song list

A total of 76 songs were available in the arcade and home versions of In the Groove.

Home versions
Two home versions of In the Groove were released. The first was released for the PlayStation 2 on June 17, 2005, and was published by RedOctane. The PS2 version contains the Novice mode carried over from In the Groove 2, Liquid Moon as a fully playable track, and 4 songs from the sequel. A PC version was released on August 16, 2006, featuring 3 songs from the now-canceled In the Groove 3, widescreen aspect ratio support, and Edit Mode. A patch named Song Pack A was later released adding the songs and theme from In the Groove 2.

In the home version, as the player progresses in the game by clearing a certain number of songs, more modifiers, marathon courses, and songs are unlocked.

Controversy

Konami filed a lawsuit against Roxor Games on an infringement of various rights on May 9, 2005 in the Eastern District of Texas, a district known for its bias for the plaintiff in patent cases. Additionally, they amended their complaint on July 1, 2005, to include the dance game "MC Groovz Dance Craze" (a game produced by Mad Catz to accompany their 3rd party dance mat). Konami primarily claims that Roxor has infringed their dancing game patent rights, but also goes on to claim that the refitting of arcade cabinets "has been done in an infringing and unfair way".

On July 10, 2005, however, Konami amended its complaint to include the In The Groove PS2 game and its publisher RedOctane.  On July 25, 2005, Roxor Games filed a counterclaim against Konami. In the counterclaim, Roxor denies the claims in Konami's complaint, stating that 'In The Groove' does not violate patent law and that claiming that Konami has engaged in unfair competition.

However, the lawsuit ultimately ended in a settlement.  On October 18, 2006, Roxor announced that Konami had acquired the intellectual property rights to the In the Groove series as part of the settlement to this litigation. The musicians and developers of the game would later go on to create Pump it Up Pro, a spinoff of the Pump it Up series featuring music and features from ITG.

See also
 Dance pad
 Dance pad video games
 In the Groove 2
 Roxor Games

References

Arcade video games
2004 video games
2005 video games
2006 video games
In the Groove (video game series)
MacOS games
PlayStation 2 games
Video games developed in the United States
Windows games
Video games involved in plagiarism controversies
Multiplayer and single-player video games
RedOctane games
Roxor Games games